Romain Manelli (born 2 June 1951) is a Luxembourgian fencer and business executive. He competed in the team épée event at the 1972 Summer Olympics.

References

External links
 

1951 births
Living people
Luxembourgian male épée fencers
Olympic fencers of Luxembourg
Fencers at the 1972 Summer Olympics